Igor Semyonovich Volchok (4 October 1931 – 19 April 2016) was a Russian professional football coach and former player.

Career
Volchok played for Moscow clubs Torpedo (1950) and CDSA (1951–52).

As a manager, Volchok led Rubin Kazan to promotion to the Russian First Division and the 1/16-finals of the Russian Cup (football).

As a coach, famous for the fact that many of his charges later successfully expressed themselves in coaching: Yuri Semin, Vladimir Eshtrekov, Alexander Averyanov, Valery Gazzaev, Givi Nodia, Valery Petrakov, Vladimir Shevchuk, Vitaly Shevchenko, Valery Gladilin, Kurban Berdyev.

Honours
Honored coach of Russia (1972)
The two-time Cup winner MSSZH (1974, 1976)
Bronze medalist of Uzbekistan (2003)

References

External links
 

1931 births
2016 deaths
Soviet footballers
Association football midfielders
FC Torpedo Moscow players
PFC CSKA Moscow players
Soviet football managers
Russian football managers
FC Lokomotiv Moscow managers
FC Kairat managers
SC Tavriya Simferopol managers
FC Shinnik Yaroslavl managers
FC Rubin Kazan managers
Russian expatriate sportspeople in Kazakhstan